Countess Maria Wilhelmina von Neipperg (later Princess of Auersperg) (30 April 1738 - 21 October 1775) was an Austrian noble and court official, known as the mistress of Francis I, Holy Roman Emperor. By birth, she was member of an ancient House of Neipperg and by marriage member of the House of Auersperg.

Early life
She was born as the third child and the youngest daughter of Imperial Count Wilhelm Reinhard von Neipperg (1684-1774) and his wife, Countess Maria Franziska Theresia von Khevenhüller-Frankenburg (1702-1760). Her father was the teacher and friend of Emperor Francis I.

Imperial court
She appeared at the Imperial court as a maid-of-honour to the Empress in 1755. The Emperor soon became infatuated with her. He had begun to lose interest in his wife, Maria Theresa of Austria, Queen of Hungary and Bohemia, who by then had borne him 16 children.

Personal life
In April 1756, she married Prince Johann Adam Joseph von Auersperg (1721-1795), upon the wish of the Empress Maria Theresa. She remained in a liaison with the Emperor until his death in 1765, however she never had any position of being an official mistress, and their relationship, though known, was never confirmed. Wilhelmina also had an affair with Charles-Joseph, Prince of Ligne. She had no children.

Legacy
Joachim Wilhelm von Brawe dedicated a tragedy to her.

References

Bibliography 
 Goldsmith, Margaret Leland: Maria Theresa of Austria A. Barker, ltd. 1936
 Mahan, J. Alexander: Maria Theresa of Austria READ BOOKS 2007 
 Morris, Constance Lily: Maria Theresa – The Last Conservative READ BOOKS 2007 

German countesses
1738 births
Mistresses of Austrian royalty
1775 deaths
Austrian ladies-in-waiting
Mistresses of Bohemian royalty
Mistresses of Hungarian royalty
18th-century Austrian people